Mark III of Alexandria may refer to:

 Pope Mark III of Alexandria, ruled in 1166–1189
 Patriarch Mark III of Alexandria, Greek Patriarch of Alexandria in 1180–1209